Bessazoon is an extinct genus of trilobite in the family Dalmanitidae. There is one described species in Bessazoon, B. gibbae.

References

Dalmanitidae
Articles created by Qbugbot